2023 AV is a near-Earth object that passed  from the centerpoint of Earth around 12 January 2023 20:09 ± 00:05 UT. The asteroid is about 2-5 meters in diameter. The asteroid came to perihelion (closest approach to the Sun) on 3 November 2022 and approached Earth from the direction of the Sun. It was first imaged by the Catalina Sky Survey on 13 January 2023 04:56, nine hours after closest approach. It was confirmed via the Near-Earth Object Confirmation Page and publicly announced by the Minor Planet Center 42.5 hours after closest approach or about 34 hours after the first image.

The 2023 Earth approach lifted the orbit and increased the orbital period from 314 days to 440 days. This changed it from an Aten asteroid to an Apollo asteroid.

References

External links 
 
 
 

Minor planet object articles (unnumbered)
20230112
20230113